The Red Oak Community School District is a rural public school district based in Red Oak, Iowa.  The district is mainly in Montgomery County, with small areas in Page and Pottawattamie counties.  The district serves the towns of Red Oak and Coburg, and surrounding rural areas.

The school's mascot is the Tigers. Their colors are orange and black.

Schools
The district operates three schools, all in Red Oak:
Red Oak Early Childhood Center
Inman Elementary School
Red Oak Junior/Senior High School

Red Oak High School

Athletics
The Tigers compete in the Hawkeye 10 Conference in the following sports:

Fall Sports
Football
Cross Country (boys and girls)
Boys' - 3-time State Champions (1965, 1966, 1967)
Volleyball

Winter Sports
Basketball (boys and girls)
Bowling
 2007 Girls' State Champions
Wrestling

Spring Sports
Golf (boys and girls)
 Soccer (boys and girls)
Tennis (boys and girls)
 Boys' - 2003 State Champions  
Track and Field (boys and girls)
 Boys' 2-time State Champions (1953, 1973)

Summer Sports
Baseball
Softball

See also
List of school districts in Iowa
List of high schools in Iowa

References

External links
 Red Oak Community School District

Education in Montgomery County, Iowa
Education in Page County, Iowa
Education in Pottawattamie County, Iowa
School districts in Iowa